Rationalism is a philosophical position, theory, or view that reason is the source of knowledge.

Rationalism may also refer to:
 Rationalism (architecture),  a term applied to a number of architectural movements
 Rationalism (international relations),  a political perspective on the international system
 Rationalism (theology), philosophical Rationalism applied in theology
 Critical rationalism, an epistemological philosophy advanced by Karl Raimund Popper
 Economic rationalism, an Australian term in discussion of microeconomic policy
 Pancritical rationalism, a theory by William Warren Bartley developed from panrationalism and critical rationalism

See also
Rational (disambiguation)
Rationale (disambiguation)
Rationality 
Rationalization (disambiguation)